This is a list of the Palestine women's national football team since their inception in 2003.

Record per opponent
Key

The following table shows Palestine's official international record per opponent:

Last updated: Palestine vs Jordan, 4 September 2022. Statistics include official FIFA-recognised matches only.

Results

2005

2006

2009

2010

2011

2012

2013

2014

2015

2017

2018

2019

2021

2022

2023

See also
 Palestine national football team results

References

2010s in the State of Palestine
2020s in the State of Palestine
women
2000s in the Palestinian territories